Dr. Octagonecologyst is the debut solo studio album by American rapper and Ultramagnetic MCs member Kool Keith, released under the alias Dr. Octagon.  Originally titled Dr. Octagon, it was released on May 7, 1996, on Bulk Recordings in the United States and Mo' Wax in the United Kingdom. The album was later reissued with a different track listing by DreamWorks Records in 1997 under the title Dr. Octagonecologyst. The album was produced by Dan "The Automator" Nakamura and featured the work of turntablist DJ Qbert. KutMasta Kurt provided additional production work. The artwork for Dr. Octagonecologyst was drawn by Brian "Pushead" Schroeder.

Dr. Octagonecologyst introduces the character of Dr. Octagon, a homicidal, extraterrestrial, time-traveling gynecologist and surgeon. The album's distinctive sound fuses genres such as psychedelic music, trip hop and electronic music. Thornton's lyrics are often abstract, absurd, and avant-garde, using surrealism, non-sequiturs, hallucinatory psychedelia, and horror and science-fiction imagery, as well as sexual humor, absurdist/surrealistic humor, and juvenile humor.

Kool Keith's lyrics and Nakamura's production were highly praised, as was DJ Qbert's innovative scratching. Dr. Octagonecologyst has since been ranked as one of the best hip hop albums of the 1990s. The character of Dr. Octagon has also appeared in Kool Keith projects like First Come, First Served (1999) and Dr. Dooom 2 (2008), both of which contain tracks in which Octagon is murdered by Dr. Dooom, The Return of Dr. Octagon, Moosebumps: An Exploration Into Modern Day Horripilation and Space Goretex. Kool Keith later stated that the album sold around 200,000 copies without any major promotion or marketing budget.

Music

Production 
Ultramagnetic MCs member Keith "Kool Keith" Thornton was seeking a new project after the release of his group's third album, The Four Horsemen, in 1993. Keith and producer KutMasta Kurt – who were working on a variety of demos together – recorded two songs called "Dr. Octagon" and "Technical Difficulties". Thornton mailed the songs to radio stations as well as giving copies to several DJs and record producer Dan the Automator. This led to Nakamura's role in producing the album. Dr. Octagonecologyst was recorded in Automator's studio in the basement of his parents' San Francisco home.

Dr. Octagonecologyst has been praised for its original sound, which has often been attributed to Nakamura. However, Thornton states that he was largely involved with the production of the album. Thornton is quoted as saying "Automator and Kurt are probably receiving more credit than I did, but I was a big musical person behind Octagon." Nakamura has said he wanted Dr. Octagonecologyst to stand out from other hip hop albums, citing the music of Eric B. & Rakim, Mantronix, and Run-D.M.C. as influences. Nakamura said, "Hip-hop was always inventive. Then the '90s hit and everyone wants to be Dr. Dre; no one wants to be their own thing anymore. Everyone now wants to have the Lexus and deal pounds of drugs. We don't do that. That's not our lifestyle. You don't see us coming out with the fur coat. There's more to music than that." The album incorporates organic instrumentation and features Moog synthesizer, flute, and string instruments.

Dialogue excerpts from pornographic films appear on multiple tracks. On the Bulk Recordings edition of the album, "halfsharkalligatorhalfman" is preceded by an excerpt from the comedy film Cabin Boy. Lily Moayeri of Rolling Stone called the album a "psychedelic hip-hop concept album." AllMusic reviewer Steve Huey wrote that the album "shed some light on the burgeoning turntablist revival via the scratching fireworks of DJ Q-Bert" and its "futuristic, horror-soundtrack production seemed to bridge the gap between hip-hop and the more electronic-oriented trip-hop". Steve "Flash" Juon of RapReviews also praised its sound, writing that "Cuts are provided with infinite skill and precision by DJ Q-Bert" and that the DJ Shadow/Automator remix of "Waiting List" is "so good that you could hardly miss the original, if indeed there was one." An instrumental version of the album was released in 1996 under the title Instrumentalyst (Octagon Beats). Kembrew McLeod of AllMusic wrote of the instrumental album, stating "If any other artist released an album such as this it would be considered throwaway trash—something for the hardcore fans. But Dan the Automator's backing tracks are so fresh and original, it's actually nice to just hear the beats minus the rhymes."

Lyrical themes and storyline 

Thornton has been praised for his lyrics, which are often abstract, surreal, and filled with non-sequiturs and juvenile humor. Music critic Chairman Mao wrote that Dr. Octagonecologyst occupies "...the heretofore-undefined area where hip-hop meets hallucinatory sci-fi and porn." In the album's narrative, Dr. Octagon is an extraterrestrial, time-traveling gynecologist and surgeon originally from Jupiter. Dr. Octagon's history is detailed throughout the album's songs, skits, and samples. "Real Raw" describes him as having yellow eyes, green skin, and a pink-and-white Afro haircut. "General Hospital," "A Visit to the Gynecologist," and "Elective Surgery" detail a list of services offered by Octagon, who claims to treat chimpanzee acne and moosebumps, and relocating saliva glands. Octagon is described as being incompetent, as many of his surgery patients die as he conducts his rounds. Octagon also pretends to be a female gynecologist and often has sex with female patients and nurses.

According to Mickey Hess, author of Is Hip Hop Dead? The Past, Present, and Future of America's Most-Wanted Music, "The album's beginning and ending tie together the stories of the fictional character Dr. Octagon and the rap career of Kool Keith Thornton himself: We begin with '3000' and end with '1977,' which purports to be an audio recording from an early rap performance by Kool Keith ... announcing a 1977 rap show featuring ... pioneers Grandmaster Flash, Kool Herc, the L Brothers, and the original scratch creator Grand Wizzard Theodore. The message is clear: Kool Keith is a part of hip-hop history, and even as rap moves on to the future, Dr. Octagon does not replace Kool Keith."

Singles 
"Earth People," released in 1995 on Bulk Recordings, was the first single from the album. The 12-inch single featured the songs "No Awareness (Lyrical Hydraulics)", "Bear Witness (Q-Bert Gets Biz)", and the "Interstellar Time Travel" and "Earth Planet" mixes of "Earth People". "3000" and "Blue Flowers" followed as singles in 1996. The "3000" 12-inch also featured the "Automator 1.2 Remix", "Bear Witness (Automator's Two Turntables and a Razor Blade Re-Edit)", and "Tricknology 101".

The "Blue Flowers" 12-inch single release featured the original and instrumental versions of the song, the "Automator Remix", and the instrumental version of the remix. The "Blue Flowers" maxi single featured the original vocal and instrumental versions, the vocal and instrumental versions of the "Automator Remix", the "Flower Bed Mix *2" by DJ Crystl, the "Secondary Diagnostic Mix" by Photek, and the DJ Hype remix. A second 12-inch single of "Blue Flowers" featured vocal and instrumental versions of the "Automator's Stop Confusing Me Remake", vocal and instrumental versions of Prince Paul's "So Beautiful Mix", the a cappella version of the song, and the track "halfsharkalligatorhalfman". A second maxi single of "Blue Flowers" featured, in addition to earlier mixes of the song, vocal and instrumental versions of the "Meditation Mix" by KutMasta Kurt. A third 12-inch single was released featuring remixes by DJ Hype and Photek.

Release and reception 

The album was initially released by Bulk Recordings on May 7, 1996, under the shorter title Dr. Octagon. Although the album sold relatively well, Nakamura has said it was under-promoted because it was released by an independent label. In both the United States and United Kingdom, the album was issued by Bulk Records on vinyl as a double LP, and on compact disc with bonus tracks,. Separately, it was also issued by Mo' Wax in the UK as a triple LP, reflecting the track listing of the Bulk Recordings compact disc. "When we did this record we thought of it as an underground joint", Nakamura said. None of the offers made by major record companies appealed to Nakamura and Thornton until DreamWorks Records offered to release the album nationally. In 1997, the label released the full album in the US under the extended title Dr. Octagonecologyst, which featured five new songs. Dr. Octagonecologyst was re-released on triple vinyl in June 2017 by Geffen/UMe/Universal via Get on Down, which included the original album, unreleased tracks from the era, and remixes.

In promotion of the album, Thornton planned to perform under the Dr. Octagon name. These performances were supposed to feature a full live band, an on-stage breakdancer and appearances by Invisibl Skratch Piklz. It's unclear why they did not play these shows, but Thornton, Nakamura and DJ Q-Bert played for the first time together on March 6, 2017, in San Francisco. Nakamura has referred to Dr. Octagon as a three-person group rather than an alias of Thornton, and these claims were reported by the press.

Dr. Octagonecologyst received largely positive reviews. Although it did not chart, Nakamura said the album sold well, even during its initial underground release. "We didn't have records in every store. We'd have 10 copies in Tower and the next day they'd be sold out, and then we wouldn't get another copy in for another month." Robert Christgau gave the album an honorable mention, citing the album's introduction and the songs "Earth People" and "Wild and Crazy" as highlights, and writing simply "the shock horror! the shock horror! the perhaps authentically crazy!" NME described the album as "nineteen strong doses of pure, undiluted hip-hop." Steve "Flash" Juon of RapReviews wrote that "If you aren't laughing, you should be bugging. Kool Keith obviously doesn't care. You should, though, because like every other record Keith has ever been on, it will be hailed ten years from now as a classic." Chairman Mao of Rolling Stone remarked that "Kool Keith leads and oversees the chaos with a Zappa-esque commitment to decadence."

Alternative Press praised the album's "deep, dubby bass lines, spooky melodic riffs and consistently heavy beats", while The New York Times called it "one of the most progressive rap projects to be released in the past year." JazzTimes lauded Thornton's lyrics, writing that his "...oddball excursions reach near-cinematic levels." Melody Maker called it "bloody essential" and stated, "While commercial American hip hop is slithering into an insipid mire of soulless, identikit swingbeat, Dr. Octagon has made an album swathed in character [...] Get yer prescription fixed." The Source awarded Dr. Octagonecologyst 3.5 out of 5 mikes, calling it a "quality album with the proper ingredients". In a more critical review, Entertainment Weekly writer David Browne praised the album's production but disliked Thornton's "inane, often gruesome" lyrics, instead recommending the album's instrumental counterpart Instrumentalyst to listeners.

Following initial reactions to the album, Dr. Octagonecologyst continued to earn praise from contemporary writers and music critics. In the Virgin Encyclopedia of Popular Music, the album received a rating of four out of five stars. In The New Rolling Stone Album Guide, Peter Relic described it as a "slab of mondo bizzaro brilliance... totally unlike anything else and totally right". PopMatters columnist Michael Frauenhofer called it "a landmark album of dope beats and mind-bending experimental flows." Steve Huey of AllMusic wrote that the album "remains as startling and original as the day it was released." In 2017, Pitchfork reviewer Nate Patrin wrote that "Dr. Octagonecologyst still feels as much out of its time as it does out of its mind." Thornton, however, has since dismissed the album, saying that it unfairly overshadows his later work, and that the only new audience it attracted was white.

Influence 
Allmusic reviewer Steve Huey wrote that Dr. Octagonecologyst "...attracted more attention than any non-mainstream rap album in quite a while, thanks to its inventive production and Keith's bizarre, free-associative rhymes." Huey also states that Dr. Octagonecologyst represented "...the first truly new, genuine alternative to commercial hip-hop since the Native Tongues' heyday. It appealed strongly to alternative audiences who'd grown up with rap music, but simply hadn't related to it since the rise of gangsta". Thornton expressed some frustration with the Dr. Octagon nickname, saying, "I just made a record. I was an artist on a project, and I think people  that I was an artist on a project. Octagon wasn't my life...I've done a lot of things that were totally around different things other than Octagon. Are some people just afraid to venture off into my life and see that I do other things which are great? I think people stuck me with something."

In 1999, Thornton introduced the character of Dr. Dooom on the album First Come, First Served (1999). The album featured a track in which the character murdered Dr. Octagon. In 2002, Thornton announced The Resurrection of Dr. Octagon, a proposed sequel to Dr. Octagonecologyst that would reintroduce the character. The resulting album, The Return of Dr. Octagon released in 2006, was largely produced without Thornton's involvement, based upon three completed vocal tracks and reconstructed outtakes. Thornton later produced Dr. Dooom 2 in response to The Return of Dr. Octagon. Later, Thornton revived the character for the albums Moosebumps: An Exploration Into Modern Day Horripilation and Space Goretex.

In 2006, Dr. Octagonecologyst was ranked among the 1001 Albums You Must Hear Before You Die by Robert Dimery.

In 2011, DIS magazine released a 32-minute mixtape, "Octagonecologyst (Sandra Bernhard Remix)" by Feminine Itch, which married instrumentals from the album with Sandra Bernhard's stand-up comedy.

Track listing

Accolades 
The information regarding accolades attributed to Dr. Octagonecologyst is taken from AcclaimedMusic.net.

Personnel 
Information taken from liner notes.

Musicians 
 Kool Keith — vocals, bass guitar (tracks 8, 13, 14 and 17)
 Dan the Automator  — violin, keyboards
 Andy Boy  — banjo, guitar (track 13)
 Phil Bright  — guitar (track 4), bass guitar (track 12)
 Curt Kobane  — clarinet, flute
 Gordon Chumway  — drums
 Burt King Kong  – organ, piano
 DJ Q-Bert  — turntables, harp
 Kelly Wootan  — tambourine

Additional personnel 
 Dan the Automator — producer, mixing, mastering
 Gordon Chumway — second engineer
 Pushead — illustrations
 Mark Senasac — mastering
 Phillip Collington (Chewbacca Uncircumcised) - composition

References

External links 
 
 www.ultrakeith.net

Dr. Octagonecologyst (Adobe Flash) at Radio3Net (streamed copy where licensed)

1996 debut albums
Science fiction concept albums
DreamWorks Records albums
Kool Keith albums
Psychedelic music albums by American artists
Albums produced by Dan the Automator
Mo' Wax albums
Songs about time travel
Albums with cover art by Pushead